Penicillium mariae-crucis is a species of the genus of Penicillium.

References

mariae-crucis
Fungi described in 1982